Davide Ancilotto (Venice, 3 January 1974 – Rome, 24 August 1997) was an Italian professional basketball player.

Career

Beginnings
Ancilotto began playing association football at a very young age in Mestre. His height made him an atypical player for his role, not aesthetically beautiful, but concrete.

Serie A and national team career
Ancilotto played 178 games in Lega Basket Serie A: the first four seasons in Caserta (1991-1995, three in A1 and the last in A2), then at Madigan Olimpia Basket Pistoia (1995-96), and with his last team, Virtus Roma, with which he collected 28 appearances, in the 1996-97 season. In 1996 he was about to be sold to the Spanish team Badalona but chose to stay in Italy and play for the team of the capital.

In his Serie A career he scored 1890 points.

He made his debut for the Italy national team on 12 November 1995 against Finland, in Helsinki, playing in 18 games and scoring 102 points.

Death
On 16 August 1997, during a friendly summer match in Gubbio in a quadrangular pre-season tournament, Ancilotto suddenly fell to the ground, a victim of brain ischemia. He died at the San Filippo Neri Hospital in Rome on the night of 24-25 August after eight days in a coma.

At his funeral, the entire world of Italian basketball gathered in the church of San Lorenzo, Duomo di Mestre. Davide Ancilotto was interred in the cemetery of Favaro in Mestre.

Posthumous honors
Several Italian cities have honored Davide Ancilotto's memory:

In Venice, his city of birth:
The CONI Mestre Sports Hall has been renamed after him.
The playground at the Albanese-Bissuola Park where he played during summer breaks has been renamed "Anciground" in his honor.

In Caserta:
The curve of the PalaMaggiò arena is officially named after him.
An alley that connects an important city road with the hamlet of San Benedetto was named after him.

In Rome:
Virtus Roma officially retired his shirt number, 4, and the fans dedicated the curve to him.
On 2 June 2007 the then-Mayor of Rome, Walter Veltroni, together with the president of Virtus Roma, Claudio Toti, and some managers of the team, inaugurated a plaque dedicated to him, positioned near the PalaLottomatica.
On the Caelian Hill, a basketball court was named after him.

In Arese (Province of Milan):
The Municipal Sports Center is named after him.

Palmarès

National

 FIBA U20 European Championship:
 Slovenia 1994

References

External links 
 
 
 

1974 births
1997 deaths
Italian men's basketball players
Italy national basketball team players
Shooting guards
Sport deaths in Italy
Sportspeople from Venice